is a Japanese television drama series that premiered on TBS on 16 April 2015. This is Yuko Oshima's first time starring in the lead role of a serial drama. It received an average viewership rating of 6.5%.

Cast
 Yuko Oshima as Bakushū Nagamitsu, a detective (Leading role)
 Kazuki Kitamura as Kakeru Mikajima
 Ryo Katsuji as Naomichi Sano, an advisor at the Yakuza countermeasure center
 Tsubasa Honda as Haruka Nagamitsu, Bakushū's sister and a nurse
 Tetsushi Tanaka as Hakubun Ishiyama, Bakushū's supervisor
 Ken Shōnozaki as Ken Tōjō, Bakushū's colleague
 Kouki Okada as Kouki Mizuhara, a detective
 Sayaka Yamaguchi as Shōko Aridome, a doctor
 Mio Miyatake as Sakura Nagamitsu, Bakushū's sister and a high school student
 Emiko Matsuoka as Yuka Mikajima, Bakushū's colleague
 Erena Kamata as Haru Mikajima
 Makiya Yamaguchi as Eitoku Tanigawa, a personal section manager at a police department
 Kim Sungrak as Senichi Mizuta, a Yakuza head
 Tadashi Sakata as Kiichirō Fujita
 Yūko Natori as Yumiko Nagamitsu, Bakushū's mother and a child care worker
 Kenichi Endō as Isao Tachibana, a Yakuza head

Episodes

Curiosities
 Kazuki Kitamura and Kenichi Endō have already performed together in 2014 in The Raid 2, as well as Yakuzas: Kenichi Endō as Hideaki Goto, head of Goto Family, a powerful yakuza family from Japan and one of two mob bosses that control Jakarta and Kazuki Kitamura as Ryuichi, the main Goto lieutenant and interpreter.
 Yuko Oshima, the protagonist of this drama, is a former member from AKB48, one of the biggest groups of J-pop and Japan. 
 Before Isao Tachibana, Kenichi Endō had already been portrayed/interpreted two notorious fictional yakuza bosses in previous films: Joji Yazaki in Crows Zero and Crows Zero 2 and Hideaki Goto in The Raid 2: Berandal. In the first two films, he is the main antagonist, and in The Raid 2 he is a kind of anti-hero / anti-villain.
 Actors with previous experiences in productions involving Yakuza: Kazuki Kitamura (Dead or Alive (film), Like a Dragon and The Raid 2), Ryo Katsuji (Crows Explode), Tetsushi Tanaka (Get Up! and  Outrage Beyond), and Kenichi Endō (Like a Dragon, Crows Zero, Crows Zero 2, The Raid 2: Berandal, Dead or Alive 2: Birds and more).
 It is possible that Senichi Mizuta, one of the bosses of the Yakuza and one of characters of this series is Zainichi Korean, mainly because he is interpreted by a Korean Zainichi, Kim Sung-Rak. With that it is quite possible that he was inspired by Machii Hisayuki, "The Ginza Tiger" and founder of Toa-kai or Tokutaro Takayama, one of bosses of Aizukotetsu-kai.

References

External links
  
  
 YAMEGOKU - HELPLINE COP -
 

Japanese drama television series
2015 in Japanese television
2015 Japanese television series debuts
2015 Japanese television series endings
TBS Television (Japan) dramas
Works by Takeharu Sakurai
Works about the Yakuza